Loenen is a former municipality in the Netherlands, in the province of Utrecht. It was in the Vechtstreek area. On January 1, 2011, Loenen merged with Breukelen and Maarssen to form Stichtse Vecht.

Population centres 
The former municipality of Loenen consisted of the following cities, towns, villages and districts: 
 Loenen (aan de Vecht) (main town)
 Loenersloot
 Mijnden
 Nieuwerhoek
 Nieuwersluis
 Nigtevecht
 Vreeland

History 
The earliest traceable mention of the game of golf refers to a game played in Loenen aan de Vecht. In his book Early Golf,  describes how the game of "Colf" or "Kolf" was played in 1297 near the castle of Kronenburg. The players had to hit the castle door in as few strikes as possible from the Court House by hitting a ball with a stick.

References

External links 
  (Dead link)
 A map of the former municipality (Dead link)

Municipalities of the Netherlands disestablished in 2011
Former municipalities of Utrecht (province)
Stichtse Vecht